Menesia shelfordi is a species of beetle in the family Cerambycidae. It was described by Per Olof Christopher Aurivillius in 1923. It is known from Borneo.

References

Menesia
Beetles described in 1923